Le Rire , is a French comedy film from 1953, directed by Maurice Regamey, starring Louis de Funès. Louis de Funès gives a definition of the laugh.

References

External links 
 
 Le Rire (1953) at the Films de France

1953 films
French comedy films
1950s French-language films
French black-and-white films
Films directed by Maurice Régamey
1953 comedy films
1950s French films